Sporting Club Luxembourg are a now defunct Luxembourgian football team which was merged with Racing Club Luxembourg to become CA Spora Luxembourg in 1923. The club was founded on 26 May 1908.

References

Defunct football clubs in Luxembourg
Football clubs in Luxembourg City
1908 establishments in Luxembourg
1923 disestablishments in Luxembourg
Association football clubs established in 1908